Petrocoptis is a genus of flowering plants belonging to the family Caryophyllaceae.

Its native range is Pyrenees to Northern Spain.

Species
Species:

Petrocoptis crassifolia 
Petrocoptis glaucifolia 
Petrocoptis grandiflora 
Petrocoptis guarensis 
Petrocoptis hispanica 
Petrocoptis montserratii 
Petrocoptis montsicciana 
Petrocoptis pardoi 
Petrocoptis pseudoviscosa 
Petrocoptis pyrenaica 
Petrocoptis wiedmannii

References

Caryophyllaceae
Caryophyllaceae genera